Ramblin' Root Beer is a root beer formerly made by The Coca-Cola Company. The product disappeared after Coca-Cola bought Barq's in 1995.  A famous ad campaign for the product featured Sarah Jessica Parker. By the 1980s, it was available primarily only in fountain outlets. In 1994, the popular pop-punk band Blink-182 thanked Ramblin' Root Beer for the making of the album “Cheshire Cat”. 

As of 2022, Ramblin' Root Beer is again available for sale, distributed by Orca Beverage of Mukilteo, Washington.

References

Root beer
Coca-Cola brands